This article partially lists the awards, nominations, and recognitions received by Jolina Magdangal.

Music and Entertainment Awards

Record

Industry Awards

Popular awards

Television Awards

Industry Awards

Popular Awards

Film Awards

Industry Awards

Popular Awards

Other awards and recognitions

Industry Awards

Popular Awards

Government Recognitions

Magazines and internet media

Others

References

Magdangal, Jolina